The Lentorata ('Flight track') is a planned railway line in Finland, designed to link Helsinki Airport to the Finnish long-distance railway network and to complement the current airport connection via the Ring Rail Line. Construction of the line is not expected to start until 2030, with the line operational several years later.

History
The Lentorata has been included in the Finnish Transport Agency's plans since 2010. Following the opening of the Ring Rail Line in 2015, Helsinki Airport gained its first railway connection through the Helsinki commuter rail network. Long-distance trains stop at Tikkurila railway station where frequent commuter trains take passengers to the airport. However, a need has also been identified for a rail link at the airport for long-distance traffic, with support from Finavia, the mayors of Helsinki and Tampere and the chief executive of the state-owned national rail company VR Group.

Route
The tunnel would surface at Kerava railway station, and the line would then continue northward to Tampere as either an upgraded Riihimäki–Tampere railway or a brand new parallel line; and eastward to Kouvola using the planned new Itärata railway.

Cost
In 2019, Helsinki Times reported that, as part of a new rail connection with an expected travel time of one hour from Helsinki to Tampere via the airport, the project would cost a total of €5.5 billion.

See also
 List of railway lines in Finland
 Rail transport in Finland
 Ring Rail Line

References

Railway lines in Finland
Proposed railway lines in Finland
5 ft gauge railways in Finland
Railway tunnels in Finland
Airport rail links